Zlatko Haraminčić (born January 8, 1942) is a Croatian former footballer and manager .

Club career  
Haraminčić began his career in 1960 with Dinamo Zagreb in the Yugoslav First League. Throughout his time with Dinamo he secured the 1962–63 Yugoslav Cup and featured in the 1963–64 European Cup Winners' Cup. In 1966, he played with Kapfenberger SV in the Austrian Football Bundesliga.

Managerial career
In 1995, he went abroad to Canada to manage Windsor Croatia, and managed in the Canadian National Soccer League with Toronto Croatia in 1997.

References

External links
 

1942 births
Living people
Footballers from Zagreb
Association football midfielders
Yugoslav footballers
GNK Dinamo Zagreb players
Kapfenberger SV players
Yugoslav First League players
Austrian Football Bundesliga players
Yugoslav expatriate footballers
Expatriate footballers in Austria
Yugoslav expatriate sportspeople in Austria
Croatian football managers
Toronto Croatia managers
Canadian National Soccer League coaches
Croatian expatriate football managers
Expatriate soccer managers in Canada
Croatian expatriate sportspeople in Canada